The Uppland Runic Inscription 699  is a Viking Age runestone engraved in Old Norse with the Younger Futhark runic alphabet. It is located at Amnö, in Enköping Municipality. The style is Pr3, and it was made by the runemaster Balli.

Inscription
Transliteration of the runes into Latin characters

 [ikilaif · let · r]as[a · st-- at · bruna · boanta ·] s[in] · h(a)n : (u)arþ [·] tauþr · a t[an](m)(a)rku · ¶ · i huita·uaþum [· bal]i · ¶ · [-r]ist...

Old Norse transcription:

 

English translation:

 "Ingileif had the stone raised in memory of Brúni, her husbandman. He died in christening robes in Denmark. Balli carved."

References

Runestones in Uppland